Curtis Perry (born 26 October 1974) is a retired American sprinter who specialized in the 200 metres.

He competed at the 1999 World Championships, but only reached the quarter-final. At the 1999 Pan American Games he won the silver medal in the 200 metres and finished fourth in the 4 × 100 metres relay. In relay he also finished second at the 1998 IAAF World Cup.

Collegiately he competed for the LSU Tigers, winning the NCAA Division I-Championship title in 1998.

His personal best time was 20.25 seconds, achieved in April 1997 in El Paso.

References

1974 births
Living people
American male sprinters
Louisiana State University alumni
Pan American Games medalists in athletics (track and field)
Pan American Games silver medalists for the United States
Athletes (track and field) at the 1999 Pan American Games
Medalists at the 1999 Pan American Games